Gilbert Klefstad (May 20, 1919 – August 8, 2007) was an American politician who served in the Iowa House of Representatives from the 31st district from 1959 to 1961 and in the Iowa Senate from 1965 to 1969.

He died on August 8, 2007, in Council Bluffs, Iowa at age 88.

References

1919 births
2007 deaths
Democratic Party members of the Iowa House of Representatives
Democratic Party Iowa state senators